King Cnut of England issued two complementary law-codes during his reign, though they are believed to have been edited or even composed by Wulfstan, Archbishop of York. They were composed in Old English and are divided into two parts, I Cnut (on ecclesiastical matters) and II Cnut (on secular matters). As well as surviving in the later Latin translation of the Instituta Cnuti, the laws of Cnut survive in four manuscripts:

 London, British Library, Cotton Nero A. i, fols. 3–41 (mid-eleventh century)
 Cambridge, Corpus Christi College 201, fols. 126–30 (mid-eleventh century)
 Cambridge, Corpus Christi College 383, pp. 43–72 (twelfth-century)
 London, British Library Harley 55, fols. 5–13 (twelfth-century).

References 

Anglo-Saxon law
Texts of Anglo-Saxon England